Theodorakis is a Greek surname. Notable people with this surname include:

 Mikis Theodorakis (1925–2021), Greek composer and politician
 Maria Theodorakis, Australian actress
 Stavros Theodorakis (born 1963), Greek journalist and politician

Greek-language surnames
Surnames
Patronymic surnames